William Aho Abou (born 30 December 1992) is an Ivorian professional footballer, who recently played as an attacking midfielder for Arles-Avignon.

External links
William Aho Abou profile at foot-national.com

1992 births
Living people
Ivorian footballers
Association football midfielders
Montpellier HSC players
AC Arlésien players
Ligue 2 players
Footballers from Abidjan